The Mitsubishi Endeavor is a mid-size crossover SUV built by Mitsubishi Motors at their manufacturing facility in Normal, Illinois from 2003 until 2011. Based on the PS platform, it was the first vehicle built under Mitsubishi's "Project America", a program aimed at introducing vehicles for North America without having to compromise for, or accommodate, global markets.

Design

Its design origins can be traced back to the Mitsubishi SSU which debuted at the 1999 North American International Auto Show, although the Endeavor does not share the concept's mechanical underpinnings. The prototype was powered by a  version of the 6A13TT 2.5-liter twin-turbo V6, which directed the power to a full-time all-wheel drive system through its INVECS-II five-speed automatic transmission and AYC. It received a mild restyle for the 2006 model year.

History
Despite some reasonably favorable reviews on its release, the Endeavor's performance in the marketplace failed to meet Mitsubishi's expectations. On its release in March 2003 the company aimed for 80,000 annual sales but achieved only 32,054 by the end of its debut year, and sales fell every year since.

Mitsubishi did not produce any 2009 Endeavor models for the retail market.  However, they did produce a 2009 model for fleet customers which shared the exterior appearance with the incoming 2010 model and was equipped with cloth interior and Bluetooth. For the 2010 model year, the Endeavor received a facelift, with new front and rear facias. The 2010 Endeavor went on sale in June 2009. It only came in one trim level for 2010, lacking the navigation package of the 2008 Limited trim, but equipped with leather seating and hands-free Bluetooth calling.

On April 25, 2011, it was announced that Endeavor production would end in August 2011.

Annual production and sales

(sources: Facts & Figures 2005, Facts & Figures 2008, Facts & Figures 2011, Facts & Figures 2013, Mitsubishi Motors website)

References

External links
Mitsubishi Endeavor official page, MitsubishiCars.com

Cars introduced in 2002
Cars discontinued in 2011
2010s cars
Endeavor
All-wheel-drive vehicles
Mid-size sport utility vehicles
Crossover sport utility vehicles
Front-wheel-drive vehicles